"Think Blue, Count Two" is a science fiction short story by Cordwainer Smith, set in his Instrumentality of Mankind future history. The story revolves around a psychological trip-wire installed to prevent an atrocity on a sleeper ship. 

Originally published in Galaxy Magazine in February 1963, it was awarded the 1990 Japanese Seiun Award for Best Foreign Language Short Story of the Year.

References

External links
 

Short stories by Cordwainer Smith
Cryonics in fiction
1963 short stories